Krapchene is a village in Montana Municipality, Montana Province, Bulgaria.

References

Villages in Montana Province